is a Japanese voice actor from Tokyo, Japan working for Artepro.

Voice roles
Aqua Kids
Basilisk: The Kouga Ninja Scrolls
Digimon Savers
Elemental Gelade
Gokusen
Hellsing Ultimate - Old Tourist (Ep. 3)
Le Chevalier D'Eon
Planetarian: The Reverie of a Little Planet
The Galaxy Railways
Tokyo Majin Gakuen Kenpucho: Tou
Yoshimune

Tokusatsu
Kamen Rider Kiva - Rhinoceros Fangire (Ep. 13 - 14)
Zyuden Sentai Kyoryuger - Beautiful Zoreamer (Ep. 38)

Dubbing
The Big Bang Theory – Leonard Hofstadter (Johnny Galecki)
Indiana Jones and the Temple of Doom (2009 WOWOW edition) – Kao Kan (Ric Young)
Overheard – Johnny Leung (Sean Lau)
Overheard 2 – Manson Lo Man-sang (Sean Lau)

References

External links
Ryūsaku Chiziwa's personal website 

Japanese male voice actors
Living people
Male actors from Tokyo
20th-century Japanese male actors
21st-century Japanese male actors
Year of birth missing (living people)